The New International Commentary on the New Testament (or NICNT) is a series of commentaries in English on the text of the New Testament in Greek. It is published by the William B. Eerdmans Publishing Company. The current series editor is Joel B. Green.

The NICNT covers all 27 books of the New Testament with the exceptions of 2 Peter and Jude.

Volumes 
 1233 pages
 678 pages
 1020 pages
 Replaced  685 pages
 1094 pages
 Replaced  888 pages
 564 pages
 1184 pages
 Replaced  1037 pages
 Replaced  736 pages

 Replaced  904 pages
 Replaced  415 pages
 692 pages
 Replaced  508 pages 
 622 pages
 Replaced  375 pages
 Replaced  240 pages
 521 pages
 Replaced  470 pages
 Replaced  328 pages
 543 pages
 Replaced  200 pages
 522 pages
 Replaced  470 pages
 160 pages
 Replaced  470 pages
 400 pages
 Replaced  296 pages
 934 pages
 768 pages
 Replaced  448 pages
 536 pages
 Replaced  227 pages
 Replaced  249 pages
 288 pages
 291 pages
 475 pages



Physical Parameters 

Reception
Christianity Today magazine included this commentary in a list of the more significant publications and achievements of Evangelicalism in the latter half of the 20th century.

See also 

 New International Commentary on the Old Testament
 New International Greek Testament Commentary
 Exegesis
 Textual criticism

Notes

Select bibliography 

 Aland, Kurt and others (eds). Novum Testamentum Graece. 27th edition (NA27). Stuttgart: Deutsche Bibelgesellschaft.
 Metzger, Bruce and others (eds). The Greek New Testament. 4th edition (UBS4). New York: United Bible Societies.

Greek New Testament
Biblical commentaries
New Testament editions